Sini may refer to:

People

Given name
 Sini (name), a Finnish female given name
 Sini Jose (born 1987), Indian sprinter
 Zeng Sini (born 1988), Chinese cyclist

Surname
 Fata Sini (born 1966), Samoan rugby footballer
 Linda Sini (1924–1999), Italian actress
 Simone Sini (born 1992), Italian footballer

Places 
 Sini, Jharkhand, India
 Sini, Chaharmahal and Bakhtiari, Iran
 Sini, Razavi Khorasan, Iran
 Sini, Sardinia, Italy

Other uses 
 Sini (script), a form of Chinese Islamic calligraphy
 Sini (Turkish dining), a communal food tray
 Sports Institute for Northern Ireland

See also 
 Saini, an Indian caste
 Sinai (disambiguation)